Nationality words link to articles with information on the nation's poetry or literature (for instance, Irish or France).

Events

Works published

Great Britain
 Anonymous, publication year uncertain, Arthurian romance adapted from two episodes in the First continuation of Chretien de Troyes's Percival, ou le Conte del Graal
 William Barlowe and William Roy, Read Me and Be Not Wroth/ The Burial of the Mass
 John Skelton:
 Diverse Ballads, publication year uncertain
 A Replication

Other
 Giorgio Anselmo, Georgii Anselmi Nepotis, Epigrammaton Libri Septem; Sosthyrides Palladis Peples Aeglogue Quatuor, an octavo volume, Venice; Italian poet writing in Latin (see also, "Deaths", below)
 Anna Bijns, Refrains, Netherlands, first edition (subsequent editions in 1548 and 1567)
 Marcello Palingenio Stellato's Zodiacus vitae ("The Zodiac of Life"), Latin-language poem by an Italian (translated into English as The Zodiac of Life by Barnabe Googe, with parts published 1560 1561, 1565)

Births
Death years link to the corresponding "[year] in poetry" article:
 November 2 – Petrus Lotichius Secundus, born Peter Lotz (died 1560), German scholar and Latin-language poet
 Rémy Belleau (died 1577), French
 Birbal, born Maheshdas Bhat (died 1586), Indian poet, wit and Grand Vizier of the Mughal court of Emperor Akbar
 Jean-Jacques Boissard (died 1602), French antiquary and Latin-language poet
 Henri Estienne (died 1598), French philologist, poet and humanist
 António Ferreira (died 1569), Portuguese
 Atagi Fuyuyasu (安宅 冬康) (died 1564), Japanese samurai and poet
 Phùng Khắc Khoan (died 1613), Vietnamese military strategist, politician, diplomat and poet

Deaths
Birth years link to the corresponding "[year] in poetry" article:
 Giorgio Anselmo, (born 1458 or earlier), Italian physician and Latin-language poet; grandson of another Giogrio Anselmo, an Italian mathematician and astronomer (died 1440) (see also "Works", above)

See also

 Poetry
 16th century in poetry
 16th century in literature
 French Renaissance literature
 Renaissance literature
 Spanish Renaissance literature

Notes

16th-century poetry
Poetry